Gary David Wheeler (1938–2010) was the mayor of Moncton from 1974 to 1979.

He was first elected to city council in June 1971 as a city councillor for Ward 2. He won election for mayor in June 1974. In 1979 he was forced to vacate his position after a Supreme Court of Canada ruling. The court found that the Court of Appeal of New Brunswick had erred in its finding that he followed proper procedures under the City of Moncton Consolidation Act by retaining, while mayor, a senior position in a contracting company in the city.

He was a founding member and chairman of the New Brunswick Hawks.

References 

1938 births
2010 deaths
Mayors of Moncton
Moncton city councillors